Hazza Al Mansouri (surname also spelled "Al Mansoori", full name Hazzaa Ali Abdan Khalfan Al Mansoori is an Emirati astronaut and the first person from the United Arab Emirates in space. Previously, he was the UAE's youngest F-16 fighter pilot.  On 25 September 2019, he launched aboard the Soyuz MS-15 spacecraft to the International Space Station, where he stayed for eight days. He landed safely in Kazakhstan, on 3 October 2019 aboard Soyuz MS-12 completing the United Arab Emirates first astronaut mission. 

Born in Abu Dhabi, Al Mansoori graduated in 2004 from Khalifa bin Zayed Air College with a bachelor's degree in aviation. Prior to becoming an astronaut, he was a Major in the United Arab Emirates Air Force, piloting a F-16 "Desert Falcon". He was selected by Mohammed bin Rashid Space Centre alongside Sultan Al Neyadi to become the country's first astronauts on 3 September 2018 and underwent training at Yuri Gagarin Cosmonaut Training Center

Early life and education 
Al Mansoori was born on 13 December 1983 in the Abu Dhabi suburb of Al Wathba. In his childhood, Hazza loved exploring and watching stars and meteors on dark nights in the desert of Liwa where he spent most of his childhood. He dreamed of being a pilot and loved to read about airplanes and space trips.

After graduating from Al Seddique High School in Liwa, Al Dhafra Region, Al Mansoori studied at Khalifa bin Zayed Air College, graduating in 2004 with a bachelor's degree in aviation.

Personal life 
Al Mansoori married in July 2007 and has four children: Mariam, Ali, Abdullah, and Mansour. He took a United Arab Emirates flag and a photo of his family with him to space.

Military career 
After graduation from Khalifa bin Zayed Air College, Al Mansoori joined the United Arab Emirates Armed Forces and became a fighter pilot. He achieved the rank of Major in United Arab Emirates Air Force. He successfully completed training on F-16 "Desert Falcon" in Arizona, United States and become the youngest F-16 pilot for his country. He went through advanced training courses in Water Survival, GYRO LAP Course up to 9G's, and RED Flag Exercise. In 2016, he was selected to train to be an air-show pilot. In 2017, he took part in the Dubai Airshow 2017 and participated in different shows in a number of cities in the UAE to mark the UAE National Day on 2 December 2017.

Astronaut career 
On 6 December 2017, UAE Vice-President and Prime Minister Sheikh Mohammed bin Rashid Al Maktoum wrote on his Twitter account, "I invite young Emiratis to register for the UAE Astronaut Programme through the Mohammed bin Rashid Space Centre". Al Mansoori was one of two people selected from 4022 candidates, following a series of tests in the UAE and Russia. His military background helped him pass the tests.

On 3 September 2018, Sheikh Mohammed tweeted: "We announced today our first astronauts to the International Space Station: Hazzaa Al Mansoori and Sultan Al Nayadi. Hazzaa and Sultan represent all young Arabs and represent the pinnacle of the UAE's ambitions".

As part of the agreement between Mohammed bin Rashid Space Centre (MBRSC) and Russian space agency Roscosmos to train Emirati astronauts, Al Mansoori went through training at Yuri Gagarin Cosmonaut Training Center in Star City, Russia in preparation for the ISS mission.

April 2019, the Mohammed bin Rashid Space Centre (MBRSC) announced that it had selected Al Mansoori as the prime astronaut for an eight-day mission to the International Space Station (ISS). Al Mansoori was assigned to Soyuz MS-15, alongside Russian commander Oleg Skripochka and American flight engineer Jessica Meir, both of whom would remain aboard the ISS for 204 days as part of Expedition 61/62. Unlike Skripochka and Meir, Al Mansoori would land eight days after launch aboard Soyuz MS-12, alongside Russian commander Aleksey Ovchinin and American flight engineer Nick Hague, who would be returning following a 203-day stay on the ISS as part of Expedition 59/60.

Al Mansoori, Skripocka and Meir launched on 25 September 2019 from the Baikonur Cosmodrome; the trio spent under six hours free flying in space before docking to the Zvezda module on the ISS. Originally the spacecraft was scheduled to dock to the Poisk module but Soyuz MS-13 had moved there a month earlier to allow for the uncrewed Soyuz MS-14 spacecraft to dock to the Zvezda module for a short period of time. Following docking the hatches between Soyuz MS-15 and Zvezda were opened, allowing Al Mansoori, Skripochka and Meir to travel inside and meet their six crew mates.

Due to the "direct handover" that was needed to facilitate Al Mansoori's short duration mission, his mission occurred during an unusual time when nine people were aboard the ISS, the three crew members who had launched on Soyuz MS-12, Aleksey Ovchinin, Nick Hague and Christina Koch, the three who had launched on Soyuz MS-13, Aleksandr Skvortsov, Luca Parmitano and Andrew Morgan, and the three who had launched aboard Soyuz MS-15. During his short stay aboard the ISS, Al Mansoori conducted 15 experiments created by UAE school students and selected under an MBRSC "Science in space" competition, conducted Earth observation experiments, filmed the first ever tour of the ISS in Arabic and became the first Middle eastern person to be studied following time in microgravity.

On 3 October 2019, Al Mansoori, Ovchinin and Hague boarded the Soyuz MS-12 spacecraft, and undocked from the ISS, ending Expedition 60 and officially beginning Expedition 61, the three spent around five hours free flying in space before de-orbiting and touching down on the Kazakh Steppe, following which Ovchinin and Al Mansouri were flown to Star City, Russia, before Al Mansouri began his journey back to the UAE.

Terminology 
Flying through an agreement between the UAE and Russian governments, Hazzaa's role aboard the Soyuz and the ISS is referred to as a spaceflight participant in Roscosmos and NASA documents and press briefings. The Mohammed bin Rashid Space Centre refers to his mission as "UAE Astronaut Mission 1" or "Zayed's Ambition".

See also 

 Timeline of space travel by nationality
 Sultan Al Neyadi
 UAE Space Agency

References 

 

Living people
Emirati astronauts
United Arab Emirates Air Force personnel
1983 births
People from Abu Dhabi
Spaceflight participants